Rivers State University Teaching Hospital formerly known as Braithwaite Memorial Specialist Hospital (abbreviated as BMSH) is a government owned hospital, named after Eldred Curwen Braithwaite, a British doctor and a pioneer of surgery. It is located in Old GRA, Rivers State a neighbourhood of Port Harcourt and is operated by Rivers State Hospital Management Board. It was established in March 1925 as Braithwaite Memorial Hospital and originally served as a medical facility for senior civil servants. It later became a General Hospital and has since gained status as a "Specialist Health Institution". In 2018, it was renamed to serve as a Teaching Hospital for the state owned university following the establishment of college of medical sciences.

Officially recognized by the Federal Ministry of Health, Braithwaite Memorial Specialist Hospital is ranked among the largest hospitals in the Niger Delta. The facility has 375 licensed beds and 731 medical staff members. Its departments include Medicine, Paediatrics, Laboratories, Radiology, Family Medicine, Obstetrics & Gynaecology, Anaesthesia, Surgery, Pathology, Ophthalmology, Accident Centre and the Surgical/Medical Emergency. Some other departments are Pharmacy, Finance, Maintenance, General Administration.

See also
Kelsey Harrison Hospital
List of hospitals in Port Harcourt

References

External links 

 Hospital Official Website

Hospitals in Port Harcourt
Hospitals established in 1925
Hospital buildings completed in 1925
Old GRA, Port Harcourt
1925 establishments in Nigeria
1920s establishments in Rivers State
Buildings and structures in Port Harcourt (local government area)
20th-century architecture in Nigeria